Rex Morgan (October 27, 1948 – January 15, 2016) was an American basketball player who played as a guard in the National Basketball Association (NBA). He was drafted in the second round of the 1970 NBA draft by the Boston Celtics and played two seasons with the team.

In college he played guard for the 1969–70 Jacksonville Dolphins men's basketball team that reached the national championship game, losing to UCLA.

Morgan was a head coach in the United States Basketball League for 14 seasons. He is the winningest coach in the USBL, with 196. In 1990, Morgan was named USBL Coach of the Year.

References

1948 births
2016 deaths
American men's basketball players
Basketball players from Illinois
Boston Celtics draft picks
Boston Celtics players
Guards (basketball)
Jacksonville Dolphins men's basketball players
Junior college men's basketball players in the United States
People from Charleston, Illinois
United States Basketball League coaches